
Danaë is a painting by the Dutch artist Rembrandt, first painted in 1636, but later extensively reworked by Rembrandt, probably in the 1640s, and perhaps before 1643.  Once part of Pierre Crozat's collection, it has been in the Hermitage Museum, in St. Petersburg, Russia since the 18th century. 

It is a life-sized depiction of the character Danaë from Greek mythology, the mother of Perseus. She is presumably depicted as welcoming Zeus, who impregnated her in the form of a shower of gold. Given that this is one of Rembrandt's most magnificent paintings, it is not out of the question that he cherished it, but it also may have been difficult to sell because of its eight-by-ten-foot size. Although the artist's wife Saskia was the original model for Danaë, Rembrandt later changed the figure's face to that of his mistress Geertje Dircx.

The reworking changed the positions of, among other things, the head, outstretched arm and legs of Danaë.  The painting has been considerably cut down. It has a hard-to-read signature with a date ending in "6", but this may not be genuine.

It was seriously vandalized in 1985, but has been restored.

Vandalism

On June 15, 1985 Rembrandt's painting was attacked by Bronius Maigys, a Soviet Lithuanian national later judged insane; he threw sulfuric acid on the canvas and cut it twice with his knife. The entire central part of the composition was turned into a mixture of spots with a conglomerate of splashes and areas of dripping paint. The worst damage was to the face and hair of Danaë, her right arm, and legs.

The process of restoring the painting began the same day. Following consultations with chemists, art restorers began washing the surface of the painting with water; they kept the painting in the vertical position, and sprayed water at the painting to prevent further degradation of the painting.

The restoration of the painting was accomplished between 1985 and 1997 by staff of the State Hermitage's Laboratory of Expert Restoration of Easel Paintings: Ye. N. Gerasimov (group leader), A. G. Rakhman, and G. A. Shirokov, with the participation of T. P. Alioshina in matters of scientific methodology.

See also

 Danaë (Correggio)
 Danaë (Klimt)
 Danaë (Titian series)

Notes

References
"Corpus", A Corpus of Rembrandt Paintings: 1635–1642, Volume 3 of Rembrandt Research Project Foundation, Editors: J. Bruyn, B. Haak, S. H. Levie, P. J. J. van Thiel, E. van de Wetering, 2013, Springer Science & Business Media, Google Books

External links
Information regarding the restoration
Detail about the painting
X-Raying of Rembrandt's Danae

Mythological paintings by Rembrandt
1636 paintings
Vandalized works of art
Crozat collection
Paintings in the collection of the Hermitage Museum
Rembrandt
Nude art